Muhammad Fazli Ilahi is a Bangladeshi academic, engineer, and educationist who is the current vice-chancellor of Ahsanullah University of Science and Technology. Previously Ilahi served as the Vice-Chancellor of Islamic University of Technology from 4 January 2003 to 31 March 2008. He was also a professor of Mechanical Engineering at Bangladesh University of Engineering and Technology.

Education 
Ilahi passed his HSC from Notre Dame College, Dhaka after completing schooling at St Gregory's High School. He completed his BSc in mechanical engineering from Bangladesh University of Engineering and Technology (BUET) in 1971. Then he went to England and subsequently earned his PhD degree in 1977 from the University of Bradford.

References

Living people
Bangladeshi mechanical engineers
Notre Dame College, Dhaka alumni
Bangladesh University of Engineering and Technology alumni
Alumni of the University of Bradford
Academic staff of Bangladesh University of Engineering and Technology
Date of birth missing (living people)
Year of birth missing (living people)